Elections to Belfast City Council were held on 22 May 2014 – on the same day as other local government elections in Northern Ireland – as part of the process of local government reform provided for in the Local Government Act (Northern Ireland) 2014.

The councils elected in the 2014 local elections across Northern Ireland operated in shadow form for one year, with the 26 councils which they replaced existing in parallel. The local government reorganisation and electoral administration is founded by the Local Government Bill.

This reform saw the Belfast City Council area expand from 51 to 60 wards. Expansion saw some areas along the western, southern and eastern fringes of Belfast incorporated into the city, with a total of 53,000 additional residents and 21,000 households transferred from bordering council areas. A total of 60 councillors were elected.

Data derived from the Council website.

Election results

Note: "Votes" are the first preference votes.

Districts summary

|- class="unsortable" align="centre"
!rowspan=2 align="left"|Ward
! % 
!Cllrs
! %
!Cllrs
! %
!Cllrs
! %
!Cllrs
! %
!Cllrs
! %
!Cllrs
! % 
!Cllrs
! % 
!Cllrs
! % 
!Cllrs
!rowspan=2|TotalCllrs
|- class="unsortable" align="center"
!colspan=2 bgcolor="" | Sinn Féin
!colspan=2 bgcolor="" | DUP
!colspan=2 bgcolor="" | Alliance
!colspan=2 bgcolor=""| SDLP
!colspan=2 bgcolor="" | UUP
!colspan=2 bgcolor="" | PUP
!colspan=2 bgcolor="" | Green
!colspan=2 bgcolor="" | TUV
!colspan=2 bgcolor="white"| Others
|-
|align="left"|Balmoral
|17.1
|1
|21.5
|1
|13.9
|1
|bgcolor="#99FF66"|23.7
|bgcolor="#99FF66"|1
|9.9
|1
|6.0
|0
|2.5
|0
|0.0
|0
|5.3
|0
|5
|-
|align="left"|Black Mountain
|bgcolor="#008800"|68.0
|bgcolor="#008800"|5
|0.0
|0
|0.8
|0
|10.0
|1
|0.0
|0
|0.0
|0
|0.0
|0
|0.0
|0
|21.2
|1
|7
|-
|align="left"|Botanic
|14.7
|1
|14.1
|1
|bgcolor="#F6CB2F"|17.9
|bgcolor="#F6CB2F"|1
|16.7
|1
|8.5
|1
|3.9
|0
|8.6
|0
|5.7
|0
|9.9
|0
|5
|-
|align="left"|Castle
|bgcolor="#008800"|25.1
|bgcolor="#008800"|1
|24.7
|2
|9.6
|1
|16.6
|1
|10.7
|1
|6.2
|0
|0.0
|0
|0.0
|0
|7.1
|0
|6
|-
|align="left"|Collin
|bgcolor="#008800"|67.4
|bgcolor="#008800"|5
|0.0
|0
|3.8
|0
|14.1
|1
|4.3
|0
|0.0
|0
|0.0
|0
|0.0
|0
|10.3
|0
|6
|-
|align="left"|Court
|24.0
|2
|bgcolor="#D46A4C"|31.0
|bgcolor="#D46A4C"|2
|1.1
|0
|4.9
|0
|5.7
|0
|19.8
|1
|0.0
|0
|7.3
|1
|6.3
|0
|6
|-
|align="left"|Lisnasharragh
|6.1
|0
|bgcolor="#D46A4C"|32.8
|bgcolor="#D46A4C"|2
|24.6
|2
|8.4
|1
|13.0
|1
|6.0
|0
|4.6
|0
|0.0
|0
|4.5
|0
|6
|-
|align="left"|Oldpark
|bgcolor="#008800"|44.6
|bgcolor="#008800"|3
|18.1
|1
|3.0
|0
|8.8
|1
|3.5
|0
|7.3
|1
|0.0
|0
|3.0
|0
|11.6
|0
|6
|-
|align="left"|Ormiston
|0.4
|0
|26.4
|2
|bgcolor="#F6CB2F"|27.1
|bgcolor="#F6CB2F"|2
|0.7
|0
|19.3
|2
|5.5
|0
|6.4
|1
|4.9
|0
|9.2
|0
|7
|-
|align="left"|Titanic
|11.7
|1
|bgcolor="#D46A4C"|26.1
|bgcolor="#D46A4C"|2
|15.1
|2
|1.0
|0
|16.7
|1
|11.6
|1
|2.1
|0
|5.8
|0
|9.8
|0
|6
|- class="unsortable" class="sortbottom" style="background:#C9C9C9"
|align="left"| Total
|29.2
|19
|19.0
|13
|11.4
|8
|10.0
|7
|9.0
|7
|6.5
|3
|2.3
|1
|2.6
|1
|10.0
|1
|60
|-
|}

District results

Balmoral

2014: 1 x SDLP, 1 x DUP, 1 x Sinn Féin, 1 x Alliance, 1 x UUP

Black Mountain

2014: 5 x Sinn Féin, 1 x People Before Profit, 1 x SDLP

Botanic

2014: 1 x Alliance, 1 x SDLP, 1 x Sinn Féin, 1 x DUP, 1 x UUP

Castle

2014: 2 x DUP, 1 x Sinn Féin, 1 x SDLP, 1 x UUP, 1 x Alliance

Collin

2014: 5 x Sinn Féin, 1 x SDLP

Court

2014: 2 x DUP, 2 x Sinn Féin, 1 x PUP, 1 x TUV

Lisnasharragh

2014: 2 x DUP, 2 x Alliance, 1 x UUP, 1 x SDLP

Oldpark

2014: 3 x Sinn Féin, 1 x DUP, 1 x SDLP, 1 x PUP

Ormiston

2014: 2 x Alliance, 2 x DUP, 2 x UUP, 1 x Green

Titanic

2014: 2 x DUP, 1 x UUP, 1 x Alliance, 1 x Sinn Féin, 1 x PUP

* Incumbent

Changes during the term

† Co-options

‡ Changes in affiliation

– Suspensions
Ruth Patterson (Independent) was suspended from the council from 4 March 2019 to the end of her term in May.

Last update 24 March 2019.

Current composition: see Belfast City Council.

References

2014
2014 Northern Ireland local elections
21st century in Belfast
2014 elections in Northern Ireland